Milford, Nova Scotia may refer to one of the following communities in Nova Scotia, Canada:

Milford (Annapolis), Nova Scotia, in Annapolis County
Milford (Halifax), Nova Scotia, in the Halifax Regional Municipality and Hants County
East Milford, Nova Scotia, in the Halifax Regional Municipality
Milford Station, Nova Scotia, in the East Hants municipal district